Founded in 1986, La Communauté électroacoustique canadienne / The Canadian Electroacoustic Community (CEC) is Canada's national electroacoustic / computer music / sonic arts organization and is dedicated to promoting this progressive art form in its broadest definition: from "pure" acousmatic and computer music to soundscape and sonic art to hardware hacking and beyond.

Among the objectives, as written in the Bylaws of the corporation, are the "support, development, production, distribution of information, materials, works... for the ea/cm community in Canada... with continuing special concern for the younger generation of individuals and women in this community. The CEC recognizes and supports the principle of sexual equality, and also, the equal status of English and French."

The CEC endeavours to foster a broad, diverse, and inclusive community of electroacoustic practitioners, raise the profile of electroacoustics in the Canadian arts milieu, and to promote Canadian electroacoustic composers and activities across Canada and internationally. The various ongoing and singular CEC activities aim to maintain and strengthen communications and information flow concerning electroacoustics.

With projects such as the electronic journal !, the online jukebox SONUS, the annual Jeu de temps / Times Play (JTTP) project for Canadian-based young and emerging sound artists, and the Cache, PRESENCE and DISContact! CD compilation series, the CEC offers Canadian electroacousticians a venue to both promote themselves and participate within the global community, thereby fostering mutual awareness and benefit in the international scene.

Projects

eContact!

The CEC's online journal of electroacoustics was launched in May 1998 as the successor to the print journal, Contact! (1988–97), and is published four times a year. Each issue focusses on a particular theme or topic, and Guest Editors have been invited to coordinate one issue per year since  (2004–05). Articles, reviews, interviews, commentaries and analyses are featured in the journal, often supported by audio and video files. All issues are freely available to the public.

Between 2005–08, a number of important changes were made to the journal's overall "look" and format, which greatly improved its navigability, readability and consistency. At the same time, the scope and size of the contributions has expanded considerably, reflecting the range of backgrounds and experiences the growing community of contributors brings to the journal.

 has matured into more than just a journal: it is recognized in the international community as a significant electroacoustic primary research source and resource which makes very efficient and unparallelled use of the potential of open online publication. Each issue can be understood as a living portal into the theme it features, and its open and flexible structure — not to mention the span of topics it covers — reflect the CEC's general policy of inclusiveness.
Issues of special note in recent years include: 9.3 — Mastering in Electroacoustics (April 2007), a bilingual issue; 10.2 — Interviews (August 2008), the largest issue yet, with 115 individual interviews; and the Special Edition 10.x — Concordia Archival Project (CAP) (March 2009), celebrating the journal's tenth year of publication.

Jeu de Temps / Times Play (JTTP) / Cache (CD compilation)
Jeu de Temps / Times Play (JTTP) was launched in 2000 to support and encourages the work of Canadian-based young and emerging sound artists. This annual project consists of a competition with more than $4300 (in 2008) worth of prizes awarded to the top five placing composers (by selection of an international jury), an issue of eContact! featuring all submissions to the project, a Cache CD compilation with the top 8–11 placing works, and international radio broadcasts and concert diffusion for the winners.

Cache is distributed internationally to people and institutions active in the production and support of electroacoustics (CEC members, radio programs and stations, concert promoters and various important cultural organizations). Several of the top-placing participants in past editions have gone on to win prizes in other renowned international electroacoustic competitions, such as Bourges, Métamorphoses and the SOCAN Foundation Awards, further confirming the healthy state of the electroacoustic community in Canada and the reputation it has developed over the years in the international scene.

With a number of new Project Partners joining the project for JTTP 2008, the size of the awards package (recordings, books and journals) given to the top five winners was substantially increased. Several members of the international jury also commented very positively on the strength of the batch of submissions in 2008.

For JTTP 2009, the CEC collaborated with Germany's national electroacoustic association, DEGEM. Similar to the collaboration in 2003 with the UK's Sonic Arts Network (SAN), submissions from both Canada and Germany were accepted. Prizes were awarded to both the Canadian and German top-placing composers, and Cache 2009 (released in Fall 2010) is a double-CD, with one CD containing selected Canadian works and the other containing selected German works.

SONUS
Launched in 2003, SONUS has grown to be the world's largest online and freely available Jukebox for electroacoustic works. More than 2000 works by established composers as well as young and emerging composers are found in SONUS and reflect the diversity of the larger field of electroacoustics itself: acousmatic, electronic and tape music, experimental, radiophonic and algorithmic works, soundscape and acoustic ecology, plunderphonics and hardware hacking and much more are featured. SONUS continues to grow, with an open and ongoing call for works from Canadian and international artists.

Education-Oriented Activities
During the 2007–08 year, two important new and exciting education-oriented projects were undertaken. A series of seminars and concerts were held in eight institutions across Canada in Fall 2007. The "Professional Production in Electroacoustics" seminars covered various topics related to electroacoustic creation, and the concerts featured works which complemented the topics covered in the seminars. Response was extremely enthusiastic and the project was a great administrative success. There is much interest in this project and discussions have taken place around a possible second edition of the project.

The Concordia Archival Project (CAP) is a joint research project between Concordia University and the Canadian Electroacoustic Community (CEC). Coordinated by the CEC from July 2007 to December 2008, CAP has allowed for the recovery and digital archiving of a major collection of electroacoustic works from the 1960s–1990s held at Concordia University in Montréal. This important initiative, funded by Heritage Canada through Canadian Culture Online, has produced the largest single primary resource for the history of electroacoustics in Canada available anywhere in the world. The project is presented through a Media Library, a series of eLearning Modules and a Special Edition 10th Anniversary issue of eContact!.

Collaborations, Conferences and Symposiums
Over the years, the CEC has assisted, collaborated on and co-produced a number of festivals, conferences and other events across Canada. Many people in the community fondly remember the >convergence< (Banff, 1989) and >>PERSPECTIVES>> (Montréal, 1991) conferences, and in recent years the CEC has  been involved in a number of local and national community initiatives, notably the east coast Oscillations festival, the Toronto Electroacoustic Symposium and the first all-Canadian edition of the 60x60 project (2008–09), as well as the Electroacoustic Seminars tour mentioned above.

In August 2010, CEC President David Ogborn will chair and coordinate the fourth annual edition of the Toronto Electroacoustic Symposium (TES), a co-production of the CEC, the University of Toronto and New Adventures in Sound Art (NAISA). The events were again planned to coincide with and complement NAISA's annual Sound Travels events. This collaboration has proven very effective in bringing together the various members of the Toronto community on a recurring basis and is helping to strengthen the local scene, as well as increase its visibility both regionally and internationally.

The CEC and the International Community

The CEC maintains close ties with internationally based sister organizations, such as the UK's Sound and Music (SAM), the Society for Electro-Acoustic Music in the United States (SEAMUS), Australasian Computer Music Association (ACMA) and others. For example, the 2003 JTTP project involved a collaboration between the CEC and SAN, whereby the competition, normally open only to Canadian young and emerging sound artists, accepted submissions by Canadian and UK participants. The resulting CD compilation, Cache 2003, contains one CD of works by Canadian artists, and one by UK artists. A similar collaboration took place with JTTP 2009, where the CEC collaborated with Germany's national electroacoustic association, DEGEM. Submissions from both Canada and Germany were accepted. Prizes were awarded to both the Canadian and German top-placing composers, and Cache 2009 (released in Fall 2010) is a double-CD, with one CD containing selected Canadian works and the other containing selected German works.

People
A more extensive list of electroacoustic composers can be found on the electroacoustic music page.

Canadian electroacoustic / electronic / computer music composers of note

Other EA/CM composers and projects

Institutions and associations

National electroacoustic organisations

Australia / New Zealand: ACMA — Australasian Computer Music Association
Belgium: FebeME — Fédération Belge de Musique Electroacoustique
Canada: CEC — Communauté électroacoustique canadienne / The Canadian Electroacoustic Community (1986)
Chile: CECh — Comunidad Electroacústica de Chile
China: EMAC — Electroacoustic Music Association of China
Denmark: DIEM — Danish Institute of Electroacoustic Music
Germany: DEGEM — Deutsche Gesellschaft für Elektroakustische Musik e.V.
Greece: HELMCA — Hellenic Electroacoustic Music Composers Association
Korea: KEAMS — Korean Electro-Acoustic Music Society
Mexico: AARSOM — Asociacion de arte sonoro Mexicano
Netherlands: NEAR — Netherlands Electro-Acoustic Repertoire Centre
Norway: NOTAM — Norsk senter for teknologi i musikk og kunst
Spain: AMEE — Asociación de Música Electroacústica de Espana (1989)
Sweden: EMS — Elektroakustisk Musik i Sverige
UK: SAM — Sound and Music
USA: SEAMUS — Society for Electro-Acoustic Music in the United States (1984)

International electroacoustic organisations
CIME/ICEM — Confédération Internationale de Musique Electroacoustique / International Confederation of Electroacoustic Music
ICMA — International Computer Music Association

Important international research and production centres
CCRMA — Center for Computer Research in Music and Acoustics (Stanford CA, USA)
CMMAS — Centro Mexicano para la Música y las Artes Sonoras (Morelia, Mexico)
GRM — Groupe de Recherche Musicales (France)
INA — Institut National de l'Audiovisuel (France)
IRCAM — Institut de Recherche et Coordination Acoustique/Musique (France)

See also

External links
Official website
The CEC’s Facebook page
The CEC on Twitter
SONUS — Online listening library (jukebox) of electroacoustic works

Notes

Music organizations based in Canada
1986 establishments in Canada